Action with Lao Children (ALC) is a continuation of Education in Laos (post-1990)

Background

Action with Lao children (ALC) is a non-governmental, non-profit organisation. ALC aims to achieve a fair global society by improving the dissemination of education so as to equip children with the rights and ability to create their own future. ALC focuses on promoting literacy education and creating a conducive environment to nurture children's ability to learn by themselves.

Founded in 1982 by Chanthasone Inthavong, ALC first started as the "Association for sending picture books to Lao children", then expanded their activities to include publishing of books in Laos. Their activities started in Japan and spread into Laos where Laotians took charge. They have currently two offices situated in Laos and Japan.

ALC seeks to fulfill its objectives through the implementation of 5 different projects aimed at improving the schooling experience of Lao children. These projects emphasize on the culture of reading and writing.

Initiatives

The Book Publishing Project facilitated the production of various categories of books written in the Lao language by Lao writers and illustrators. It also introduced picture books which are hard to come by in Laos. As of May 2009, about 690,000 books with 148 titles have been published.

The Reading Promotion Project was implemented to improve the reading environment of Lao children through increased accessibility to books. It consists of the "Book Distribution Project" and "School Library Project". As a result of these efforts, books have been distributed to over 3000 primary and secondary schools in Laos since 1992. 190 school libraries have also been opened to encourage children to pick up reading as a habit. People living in the remote areas or villages of ethnic minorities benefit the most from this project since availability of education is lower there.

In order to fully utilize the books distributed, Reading Promotion Seminars are organized for teachers to teach them the importance and pleasure of reading and the proper management of libraries.

In 1994, the first Children's Cultural Center was established in Vientiane. These centers serve to change the Lao educational environment by creating platforms where the children can perform and express themselves. This is in line with the promotion of children rights stated in the UN Charter of the Rights of the Child. Activities implemented in these centers include drawing, handicraft, traditional dance and music. At present, there are 20 centers nationwide.

Problems
ALC has been successful as proven by the falling failure rates in exams and rates of absentism in class. However, there are limitations to the programmes implemented. Close monitoring of schools has proven that many teachers fail to fully utilize books and motivate children to read. This is attributed to the limited time given to them to fully grasp the contents during the seminar. Skills learnt are also not transferred to the successors upon resignation. Besides, quality improvement of Lao language education is hindered due to the incapabilities of teachers in that aspect. In order to address these issues, ALC needs to do more by looking into the improvement of teaching methods of teachers.

Action with Lao Children at a glance
Below is a table, in chronological order, the events ALC has initiated or participated in.

Area of activities
The picture below shows a map of Laos with the provinces numbered and defined. Apart from Oudoxmy and Phongsaly, ALC is active in all the other provinces of Laos.

Taken from the Wikipedia Commons.

References 

Education in Laos